Landing Creek is a stream in the U.S. state of South Dakota.

Landing Creek was the site of a riverboat landing, hence the name.

See also
List of rivers of South Dakota

References

Rivers of Gregory County, South Dakota
Rivers of South Dakota